Eminence is a super-yacht built in 2008 at the shipyard Abeking & Rasmussen. The interior and exterior design of Eminence was done by Reymond Langton Design Ltd. She can carry 12 guests in 8 cabins. The yacht has three sister-ships, Amaryllis, C2 and Titan.

Design 
The hull is steel, and the superstructure is aluminium. The yacht is Lloyd's registered, issued by the Cayman Islands.

Engines 
The main power-plant of the yacht is composed of two Caterpillar Inc. 3516 DITA with a power of  each.

See also 
 Amaryllis
 C2
 Titan
 Motor yacht
 List of motor yachts by length
 List of yachts built by Abeking & Rasmussen

References

2008 ships
Motor yachts
Ships built in Germany